Øvre Hein is a lake in the municipalities of Nore og Uvdal and Hol in Viken county, Norway. The lake is ;located in the eastern Hardangervidda and lies partly in the Hardangervidda National Park.

See also
List of lakes in Norway

References

Lakes of Viken (county)